Confucius Temple is a  summit located in the Grand Canyon, in Coconino County of northern Arizona, US. Confucius Temple is named for Confucius (551–479 BC), the Chinese philosopher. This name was applied by Clarence Dutton, who began the tradition of naming geographical features in the Grand Canyon after mythological deities. Confucius Temple is one of the Twin Buttes in the Grand Canyon, the other being Mencius Temple (7,001 ft), which is named for Mencius, considered the second-most famous sage, after only Confucius himself. This mountain's name was officially adopted in 1906 by the U.S. Board on Geographic Names. According to the Köppen climate classification system, Confucius Temple has a Cold semi-arid climate.

Geology

The top cupola of Confucius Temple is composed of the basal layer of Permian Kaibab Limestone, upon a similar-thickness unit of slope-forming Toroweap Formation, overlaying cream-colored, cliff-forming, Permian Coconino Sandstone. The sandstone, which is the third-youngest of the strata in the Grand Canyon, was deposited 265 million years ago as sand dunes. Below the Coconino Sandstone is reddish, slope-forming, Permian Hermit Formation, which in turn overlays the Pennsylvanian-Permian Supai Group. Further down are strata of the conspicuous cliff-forming Mississippian Redwall Limestone, the Cambrian Tonto Group, and finally granite of the Paleoproterozoic Vishnu Basement Rocks at Colorado River level. Precipitation runoff from Confucius Temple drains west to Tuna Creek, and east to Crystal Creek, both north tributaries of the Colorado River.

See also
 Geology of the Grand Canyon area

References

External links 

 Weather forecast: National Weather Service
 Summit of Confucius Temple: YouTube
 Confucius and Mencius Temples from Point Sublime: Flickr photo
 Confucius Temple photo by Harvey Butchart

Grand Canyon
Landforms of Coconino County, Arizona
Mountains of Arizona
Mountains of Coconino County, Arizona
Colorado Plateau
Grand Canyon National Park
North American 2000 m summits
Sandstone formations of the United States